A Place in the World is the sixth studio album by American country music artist Mary Chapin Carpenter, and was a No. 3 Country Album on the Billboard charts. Album tracks that entered the Hot Country Singles chart were "Let Me into Your Heart" at No. 11, "I Want to Be Your Girlfriend" at No. 35, and "Keeping the Faith" at No. 58. Carpenter wrote all of the songs on the album singlehandedly.

Track listing
All songs written by Mary Chapin Carpenter.
 "Keeping the Faith" – 3:19
 "Hero in Your Own Hometown" – 3:50
 "I Can See It Now" – 3:34
 "I Want to Be Your Girlfriend" – 3:30
 "Let Me into Your Heart" – 2:54
 "What If We Went to Italy" – 3:38
 "That's Real" – 3:53
 "Ideas Are Like Stars" – 4:05
 "Naked to the Eye" – 3:54
 "Sudden Gift of Fate" – 5:05
 "The Better to Dream of You" – 3:18
 "A Place in the World" – 4:06

Personnel
Pete Barenbregge – tenor saxophone
J.T. Brown – background vocals
Jon Carroll – piano, accordion, background vocals
Mary Chapin Carpenter – lead vocals, background vocals, acoustic guitar
Shawn Colvin – background vocals
Mike Crotty – baritone saxophone, tenor saxophone
Bob Glaub – bass guitar
Rich Haering – trumpet
John Jennings – acoustic guitar, electric guitar, backpacker, baritone guitar, bass guitar, fretless bass, lap steel guitar, percussion, synthesizer, background vocals
Duke Levine – electric guitar, mandola
Robbie Magruder – drums
Dave Mattacks – drums, tambourine
Kim Richey – background vocals
Harry Stinson – drums, cowbell
Benmont Tench – piano, organ

String section
Kim Miller, Margaraet Gutierrez, Lilly Soong Kramer, Theresa Lazar, Steven Romer, Matthew Loden, Mark Dulac, Ozman Kivrak, Joan Singer, Vickie Yanics, Tracy Jasas, Christoff Richter – violins
Marcio Botelho, Timothy Butler, Nancy Jo Snyder, David Teie – cellos

Strings and horns conducted and arranged by Michael "Rico" Petruccelli.

Charts

Weekly charts

Year-end charts

Certifications

References

Columbia Records albums
Mary Chapin Carpenter albums
1996 albums